The Thomas McCann House, also known as the General Manager's House for Shevlin-Hixon Lumber Company, is a historic home in Bend, Oregon. It is located at 440 NW Congress Street and was listed on the National Register of Historic Places in 1980.

References

Houses completed in 1915
Georgian Revival architecture in Oregon
Houses on the National Register of Historic Places in Bend, Oregon
Colonial Revival architecture in Oregon
1915 establishments in Oregon